Mexican Borders could refer to:

Mexican Boarders, a 1962 Looney Tunes short featuring Speedy Gonzales and Slowpoke Rodriguez
Borders of Mexico, international borders Mexico shares with three nations